MGO VFSO "Dynamo", commonly known as Dynamo Moscow is a Russian sports club based in Moscow. Founded by Felix Dzerzhinsky on 18 April 1923, Dynamo Moscow was the first institution created from the All-Union Dynamo Sports Club.

Dynamo Moscow developed numerous athletes. Among them, multiple Olympic medalists like fencer Galina Gorokhova and gymnast Mikhail Voronin, Ballon d'Or winner the "Black Spider" Lev Yashin, three-time ice hockey Olympic gold medalist Vitaly Davydov, and one of the most decorated in rhythmic gymnastic, Alina Kabaeva.

Since December 2019, the Dynamo Society is headed by the FSB two-star general Anatoly Gulevsky.

Departments

Notable athletes gallery

References

 

Sports clubs established in 1923
Multi-sport clubs in Russia
Sports clubs in Moscow